Transit is a 1980 Israeli drama film directed by Daniel Wachsmann. It was entered into the 30th Berlin International Film Festival.

Cast
 Itzhak Ben-Zur
 Gedalia Besser
 Yair Elazar
 Ruth Geller
 Fanny Lubitsch
 Gita Luka
 Amnon Moskin
 
 Talia Shapira
 Moti Shirin
 Gideon Singer

References

External links

1980 films
1980 drama films
1980s Hebrew-language films
Films directed by Daniel Wachsmann
Israeli drama films